The 1987–88 Northern Premier League season was the 20th in the history of the Northern Premier League, a football competition in England. Teams were divided into two divisions.

Premier Division

The Premier Division featured two new teams:

 Frickley Athletic relegated from Football Conference
 Gateshead relegated from Football Conference

League table

Results

Division One

It was the first Division One season, it was formed by clubs from:
 12 clubs joined from the NWCL Division One:
Stalybridge Celtic
Accrington Stanley
Winsford United
Fleetwood Town
Penrith
Congleton Town
Eastwood Hanley
Radcliffe Borough
Leek Town
Netherfield
Irlam Town
Curzon Ashton
 2 clubs joined from the NWCL Division Two:
Droylsden
Lancaster City
 5 clubs joined from the NCEL Premier Division:
Alfreton Town
Farsley Celtic
Sutton Town
Harrogate Town
Eastwood Town

League table

Promotion and relegation 

In the twentieth season of the Northern Premier League Chorley (as champions) were automatically promoted to the Football Conference. Meanwhile, Oswestry Town folded at the end of the season and Workington were relegated; these three sides were replaced by Division One winners Fleetwood Town, second placed Stalybridge Celtic and newly admitted Shepshed Charterhouse. Colne Dynamoes, Bishop Auckland, Whitley Bay and Newtown were admitted into Division One at the end of the season.

Cup Results 
Challenge Cup:

Goole Town bt. Barrow

President's Cup:

South Liverpool 5–4 Southport

Northern Premier League Shield: Between Champions of NPL Premier Division and Winners of the NPL Cup.

Chorley bt. Goole Town

External links 
 Northern Premier League Tables at RSSSF

Northern Premier League seasons
6